Sokodé Airport  is an airport serving Sokodé in Togo.

See also
Transport in Togo

References

 OurAirports - Sokodé
 Great Circle Mapper - Sokodé
 SkyVector - Sokode
 Google Earth

External links

Airports in Togo